The discography of American rapper Yeat consists of three studio albums, four mixtapes, six extended plays, and thirteen singles. 

On September 20, 2018, Yeat released his debut extended play titled Deep Blue Strips. He released his debut mixtape titled Wake Up Call on January 9, 2019. He released his second extended play titled Different Creature on July 18, 2019. Yeat then released his second mixtape titled I'm So Me on January 3, 2020.

On April 18, 2020, Yeat self-released his third extended play titled We Us on April 18, 2020 only for digital downloading. He released his fourth extended play titled Hold On on September 11, 2020. Yeat then released his third mixtape titled Alive on April 2, 2021 through his new label, Twizzy Rich.

Yeat started gaining recognition when he released his fourth mixtape 4L on June 11, 2021, which had included many songs that gained popularity on the social media app TikTok. He then released his debut studio album Up 2 Me on September 10, 2021, which also had tracks go viral on the platform. In the week of January 19, 2022, Up 2 Me debuted at number 183 on the Billboard 200, making it Yeat's first project to go on the chart. It later peaked at number 58.

He then released his second studio album and sequel to his April 2021 mixtape 2 Alive on February 18, 2022 through Geffen Records, Interscope Records, Field Trip Recordings, Listen to the Kids and Twizzy Rich, and peaked at number 6 on the Billboard 200. 

On June 28, 2022, Yeat released a single titled "Rich Minion" on June 28, 2022, that was used in a trailer for Minions: The Rise of Gru produced by Lyrical Lemonade. The song was later associated with the Gentleminions, a TikTok trend involving people dressed in formal attire to go watch the movie in theaters. The song also peaked at number 99 on the Billboard Hot 100, making it his second song to reach that chart, the first being "Money So Big", which debuted at number 95.

On September 2, 2022, Yeat released a single from his sixth extended play Lyfe titled "Talk". Lyfe was released a week later on September 9, 2022 with a sole feature from American rapper Lil Uzi Vert. His third studio album Afterlyfe was released on February 24, 2023.

Studio albums

Mixtapes

Extended plays

Singles

Other charted and certified songs

Guest appearances

Notes

References

Discography
Discographies of American artists